The paramedian pontine reticular formation, also known as PPRF or paraabducens nucleus, is part of the pontine reticular formation, a brain region without clearly defined borders in the center of the pons. It is involved in the coordination of eye movements, particularly horizontal gaze and saccades.

Input, output, and function 
The PPRF is located anterior and lateral to the medial longitudinal fasciculus (MLF). It receives input from the superior colliculus via the predorsal bundle and from the frontal eye fields via frontopontine fibers. The rostral PPRF probably coordinates vertical saccades; the caudal PPRF may be the generator of horizontal saccades. In particular, activity of the excitatory burst neurons (EBNs) in the PPRF generates the "pulse" movement that initiates a saccade. In the case of horizontal saccades the "pulse" information is conveyed via axonal fibres to the abducens nucleus, initiating lateral eye movements. The angular velocity of the eye during horizontal saccade ranges from 100 to 700 degrees per second. Larger saccades have faster pulses; the PPRF is involved in this determination.

Lesions
Unilateral lesions of the PPRF produce characteristic findings:
 Loss of horizontal saccades directed towards the side of the lesion, no matter the current position of gaze
 Contralateral gaze deviation (acute lesions, such as early stroke, only)
 Gaze-evoked lateral nystagmus on looking away from the side of the lesion
Bilateral lesions produce horizontal gaze palsy and slowing of vertical saccades

See also
Internuclear ophthalmoplegia
Multiple sclerosis
One and a half syndrome
Ophthalmoparesis
Reticular formation
Stroke
Paramedian reticular nucleus
Opsoclonus
Saccade

References
 Brazis, P.W., Masdeu, J.C., and Biller, J.  Localization in Clinical Neurology, 4th edition.  Lippincott, Williams, and Wilkins, Philadelphia, 2001; pp. 213–216.  
 Adapted from Leigh, R.J., and Zee, D.S.  The Neurology of Eye Movements, 3rd edition.  Oxford University Press, Oxford, England, 1999; p. 499.  

Pons